James D. Plummer is a Canadian-born electrical engineer. He is the John M. Fluke Professor of Electrical Engineering at Stanford University, and from 1999 to 2014 served as Frederick Emmons Terman Dean of the School of Engineering.

Education and academic career
Jim Plummer was born in Toronto, Canada, and educated in the United States. Plummer completed his BS in electrical engineering at the University of California, Los Angeles in 1966. He received his MS in 1967 and PhD in 1971, both in electrical engineering from Stanford University.

Prior to joining the faculty of the Stanford Department of Electrical Engineering in 1978, Plummer was a research associate and associate director of the Integrated Circuits Laboratory (ICL). Stanford's Integrated Circuits Lab (ICL) was revamped to accommodate microchip fabrication and research, opening a new facility in 1984 under the directorship of James D. Meindl. The lab's cleanroom and vibration-free construction was state-of-the-art. Jim Plummer was director of the ICL until 1993.

From 1993 to 1996, Plummer was senior associate dean of Stanford University School of Engineering. He was director of the Stanford Nanofabrication Facility (SNF) from 1994 to 2000. From 1997 to 1999, he was chair of the Stanford Department of Electrical Engineering.

Plummer was selected as dean of Stanford University School of Engineering from 1999 through 2014. He is the longest-serving dean of the school to date.

During his tenure as Frederick Emmons Terman Dean of the School of Engineering, he is credited with changing Stanford's character of graduate and undergraduate engineering curriculum toward being hands-on, interdisciplinary and creative. During his time as dean, the percentage of engineering undergraduates increased from 20% to 35% of the student body.

Stanford University's Science and Engineering Quad was also completed in 2014, completing a 25-year effort to house all nine engineering departments in 21st century facilities. Plummer strongly supported and led the School of Engineering toward bioengineering. He helped establish the Department of Bioengineering, which started in 2002. Bioengineering is the only joint department at Stanford, run by the School of Engineering and the School of Medicine.

Research
Plummer's research lies in semiconductor devices and technology, primarily silicon based devices but recently also in wide bandgap materials for power applications.
 Plummer holds approximately 20 patents.

Awards and honors
 2015 – IEEE Founders Medal
 2008 – Elected as Fellow, American Academy of Arts and Sciences (AAAS)
 2007 – IEEE Andrew S. Grove Award
 2004 – McGraw-Hill/Jacob Millman Award, for outstanding contributions to EE education
 2003 – J. J. Ebers Award, IEEE 
 1996 – Member of the United States National Academy of Engineering
 1995 – Society of Women Engineers, Best Teacher Award
 Fellow of the IEEE

References

External links 
 Stanford profile, Jim Plummer
 Stanford School of Engineering Former Deans
 Academic Tree, James D. Plummer

20th-century American engineers
Stanford University Department of Electrical Engineering faculty
Living people
American electrical engineers
Stanford University School of Engineering faculty
Fellow Members of the IEEE
American university and college faculty deans
Fellows of the American Academy of Arts and Sciences
21st-century American engineers
Members of the United States National Academy of Engineering
Engineers from Toronto
Scientists from Toronto
20th-century Canadian engineers
21st-century Canadian engineers
Canadian emigrants to the United States
University of California, Los Angeles alumni
Canadian electrical engineers
Canadian university and college faculty deans
Year of birth missing (living people)